Ujang is a male Sundanese given name, meaning young boy. Other forms of this name is Jajang.

Ujang as first name was found 276 times in 8 different countries.

Possible meanings 
The meaning of the name Ujang are "young boy" or "little brother" in Sundanese.

Notable people with this name 

 Ujang Ronda, an Indonesian actor and comedian
 Ujang Koswara, a Social Entrepreneur & Community Empowerment Activist in Indonesia
 Ujang Iskandar, a regent of West Kotawaringin district, Central Kalimantan for the period 2005–2010.

Fictional character 

 Kang Ujang, a character of the MD Animation cartoon Adit & Sopo Jarwo
 Ujang Rambo, one of the characters in the soap opera Preman Pensiun

See also

References 

Given names
Sundanese masculine given names